Southwest City is a city in McDonald County, Missouri, United States. The population was 937 at the 2010 census, at which time it was a town. It is located in the southwestern corner of the state of Missouri.

History
Southwest City was platted in 1870. It was named from its location in the southwest corner of the county and state.

Geography
Southwest City is located at  (36.516386, -94.611917).

Demographics

2010 census
As of the census of 2010, there were 970 people, 319 households, and 225 families living in the city. The racial makeup of the city was 57.5% White, 0.1% African American, 3.7% Native American, 0.1% Asian, 1.6% Pacific Islander, 33.3% from other races, and 3.6% from two or more races. Hispanic or Latino of any race were 50.8% of the population.

There were 319 households, of which 47.3% had children under the age of 18 living with them, 47.0% were married couples living together, 15.0% had a female householder with no husband present, 8.5% had a male householder with no wife present, and 29.5% were non-families. 22.9% of all households were made up of individuals, and 8.7% had someone living alone who was 65 years of age or older. The average household size was 3.04 and the average family size was 3.53.

The median age in the city was 28.6 years. 34% of residents were under the age of 18; 10.1% were between the ages of 18 and 24; 29.4% were from 25 to 44; 18.8% were from 45 to 64; and 7.7% were 65 years of age or older. The gender makeup of the city was 51.8% male and 48.2% female.

2000 census
As of the census of 2000, there were 905 people, 311 households, and 213 families living in the town. The population density was 613.6 people per square mile (237.5/km). There were 340 housing units at an average density of 244.0/sq mi (94.4/km). The racial makeup of the town was 71.81% White, 0.12% African American, 7.13% Native American, 0.23% Asian, 15.91% from other races, and 4.80% from two or more races. Hispanic or Latino of any race were 37.31% of the population.

There were 311 households, out of which 41.8% had children under the age of 18 living with them, 51.1% were married couples living together, 11.9% had a female householder with no husband present, and 31.2% were non-families. 26.4% of all households were made up of individuals, and 11.3% had someone living alone who was 65 years of age or older. The average household size was 2.75 and the average family size was 3.31.

In the town the population was spread out, with 33.8% under the age of 18, 10.2% from 18 to 24, 27.8% from 25 to 44, 17.1% from 45 to 64, and 11.1% who were 65 years of age or older. The median age was 29 years. For every 100 females, there were 94.8 males. For every 100 females age 18 and over, there were 86.2 males.

The median income for a household in the town was $22,721, and the median income for a family was $24,808. Males had a median income of $19,688 versus $19,107 for females. The per capita income for the town was $9,526. About 29.8% of families and 40.2% of the population were below the poverty line, including 51.9% of those under age 18 and 33.9% of those age 65 or over.

References

External links
 City website
 Historic maps of Southwest City in the Sanborn Maps of Missouri Collection at the University of Missouri

Cities in McDonald County, Missouri
Cities in Missouri
1870 establishments in Missouri